Los tres berretines (The Three Whims) is a 1933 Argentine black and white comedy film, the first film made by the newly formed Lumiton film studio, and one of the first sound films made in Argentina. It was a great success and launched the film career of the comedian Luis Sandrini. In 2022, the film was included in Spanish magazine Fotogramass list of the 20 best Argentine films of all time.

Synopsis
The film has traditional popular melodrama plot elements, and includes performances of tango songs.
It depicts a family whose members are obsessed with the three national berretines (interests or hobbies) of tango, football and cinema.
(In the play the last berretín was radio.).
The family is middle class and makes its living from a hardware store.
The father complains that the hobbies lead the family to neglect business.
In the end, the father himself succumbs to all three hobbies.

It is one of the first Argentine films dealing with the themes of immigration (to Argentina).

Cast
The full cast was:

Luis Arata	
Luis Sandrini	
Luisa Vehil		
Florindo Ferrario		
Benita Puértolas		
Héctor Quintanilla		
Malena Bravo	
Dolores Dardes	
Miguel Ángel Lauri		
Luis Díaz	
Dora del Grande		
Mario Danesi	
Homero Cárpena	
Mario Mario		
Trío Foccile		
Marafiotti
Aníbal Troilo	
Miguel Leme		
Osvaldo Fresedo		
Leonor Rinaldi (uncredited)

Production
Los tres berretines was directed by Enrique Telémaco Susini and starring the local actors Luis Sandrini and Luisa Vehil.
The American cinematographer John Alton was not credited but may have played an important role in direction and cinematography.
Los tres berretines was based on a hit play of the same name, in which the circus performer and actor Luis Sandrini played Eusebio, a brother with a dream of becoming a famous tango composer. Lumiton expanded his role in the film version.
Los tres berretines was released on 19 May 1933 in the Ástor in Buenos Aires.
It was the second Argentine film with an optical soundtrack. The first was ¡Tango!, released the week before.

Reception
The film, which cost 18,000 pesos to produce, earned over one million.
Sandrini's performance made him the first local cinema star.

References
Citations

Sources

1933 films
1930s Spanish-language films
Argentine black-and-white films
1933 comedy films
Argentine comedy films
Films about immigration to Argentina